The Pysht Formation is a geologic formation in Washington (state). It preserves fossils dating back to the Paleogene period.

Fossil content

Crustaceans

See also

 List of fossiliferous stratigraphic units in Washington (state)
 Paleontology in Washington (state)

References

 

Paleogene geology of Washington (state)